HMS Agincourt was a 74-gun third-rate ship of the line of the Royal Navy, launched on 19 March 1817 at Devonport.

 (January 1840) : Out of commission at Plymouth
 1 February 1842-May 1845 : Commanded (from commissioning at Plymouth) by Captain Henry William Bruce, flagship of Rear-Admiral Thomas John Cochrane, East Indies
 6 May 1845 - 4 September 1847 : Commanded by Captain William James Hope Johnstone, flagship of Rear-Admiral Thomas John Cochrane, East Indies
 28 January 1848 - 31 Mar 1849 : Commanded by Captain William Bowen Mends, depot ship of Ordinary, Devonport
 24 March 1849 : Commanded by Captain William James Hope Johnstone, depot ship of Ordinary, Devonport
 1865 : Renamed Vigo

She was placed on harbour service in 1848, and sold out of the Navy in 1884.

Notes

References

Lavery, Brian (2003) The Ship of the Line - Volume 1: The development of the battlefleet 1650-1850. Conway Maritime Press. .

External links
William Loney RN
HMS Agincourt - East India Station - Seniority List of Commissioned , Subordinate and Warrant Officers - 1847

Ships of the line of the Royal Navy
Vengeur-class ships of the line
Ships built in Plymouth, Devon
1817 ships